Shiloh National Military Park preserves the American Civil War Shiloh and Corinth battlefields.  The main section of the park is in the unincorporated town of Shiloh, about nine miles (14 km) south of Savannah, Tennessee, with an additional area located in the city of Corinth, Mississippi, 23 miles (37 km) southwest of Shiloh.  The Battle of Shiloh (April 6–7, 1862) began a six-month struggle for the key railroad junction at Corinth.  Afterward, Union forces marched from Pittsburg Landing to take Corinth in a May siege, then withstood an October Confederate counter-attack.

The visitor center provides exhibitions, films and a self-guided auto-tour.

Shiloh battlefield

The Battle of Shiloh was one of the first major battles in the Western Theater of the American Civil War. The two-day battle, April 6–7, 1862, involved about 65,000 Union troops under Ulysses S. Grant and Don Carlos Buell and 44,000 Confederates under Albert Sidney Johnston (killed in the battle) and P.G.T. Beauregard. The battle resulted in nearly 24,000 killed, wounded, and missing. The two days of fighting did not end in a decisive tactical victory for either side—the Union held the battlefield but failed to pursue the withdrawing Confederate forces. However, it was a decisive strategic defeat for the Confederate forces that had massed to oppose Grant's and Buell's invasion through Tennessee. After the Battle of Shiloh, the Union forces proceeded to capture Corinth and the critical railroad junction there.

The battlefield is named after Shiloh Methodist Church, a small log church near Pittsburg Landing, Tennessee. Pittsburg Landing is the point on the Tennessee River where the Union forces landed for the battle; they referred to the battle as "The Battle of Pittsburg Landing".

Park information
 Total area: 3,997 acres (16.18 km2)
 Federal area: 3,942 acres (15.95 km2)
 Nonfederal area: 55 acres (0.22 km2)

The Shiloh National Military Park was established on December 27, 1894. In 1904, Basil Wilson Duke was appointed commissioner of Shiloh National Military Park by President Theodore Roosevelt. There were requests of local farmers who had grown tired of their pigs rooting up the remains of soldiers that had fallen during the battle, insisting that the federal government do something about it.  The park was transferred from the War Department to the National Park Service on August 10, 1933.  As with all historic areas administered by the National Park Service, the military park was listed on the National Register of Historic Places on October 15, 1966. On September 22, 2000, sites associated with the Corinth battlefield (see First and Second Battles of Corinth) were added to the park. The Siege and Battle of Corinth Sites was designated a National Historic Landmark on May 6, 1991. The National Park Travelers Club held its 2013 convention at Shiloh. As of late 2021, the American Battlefield Trust and its federal, state and local partners have acquired and preserved  of the battlefield in more than 25 different transactions since 2001. Most of this land has been sold or conveyed to the National Park Service and incorporated into the park.

Visitor center
Permanent exhibitions, films, displays and self-guided 12-mile auto-tour, stopping at the Peach Orchard, the Hornet's Nest and General Johnston's death site.

Shiloh National Cemetery
Shiloh National Cemetery is in the northeast corner of the park adjacent to the visitor center and bookstore.  Buried within its  are 3584 Union dead (of whom 2357 are unknown), who were re-interred in the cemetery created after the war, in 1866.   There are two Confederate dead interred in the cemetery.  The cemetery operations were transferred from War Department to the National Park Service in 1933. An unknown number of Confederate dead are interred in mass graves in the park.

Shiloh Indian Mounds Site 

The Shiloh battlefield has within its boundaries the well preserved prehistoric Shiloh Indian Mounds Site, which is also a National Historic Landmark. The site was inhabited during the Early Mississippian period from about 1000 to 1450.

See also
 Memphis and Charleston Railroad
 List of Mississippian sites

References

 The National Parks: Index 2001–2003. Washington: U.S. Department of the Interior.

External links

Civil War Trails
NPS Shiloh Auto Tour Map linked to photo galleries
Guide to records (appropriations and expenditures) for Shiloh National Cemetery, 1913–1933
Guide to records (general administrative files) of Shiloh National Military Park
Guide to records (register of visitors) to Shiloh National Cemetery, 1891–1932

Protected areas established in 1894
Protected areas of Alcorn County, Mississippi
Battlefields of the Western Theater of the American Civil War
Archaeological sites in Tennessee
Protected areas of Hardin County, Tennessee
Historic American Engineering Record in Tennessee
National Battlefields and Military Parks of the United States
National Historic Landmarks in Tennessee
Cemeteries on the National Register of Historic Places in Tennessee
National Historic Landmarks in Mississippi
Museums in Hardin County, Tennessee
American Civil War museums in Tennessee
Archaeological museums in Tennessee
National Park Service areas in Mississippi
Parks in Mississippi
National Park Service areas in Tennessee
1894 establishments in Tennessee
Conflict sites on the National Register of Historic Places in Tennessee
National Register of Historic Places in Hardin County, Tennessee
American Civil War on the National Register of Historic Places
Parks on the National Register of Historic Places in Tennessee
2000 establishments in Mississippi